The 2013 Lenoir–Rhyne Bears football team represented Lenoir–Rhyne University as a member of the South Atlantic Conference (SAC) during the 2013 NCAA Division II football season. They were led by third-year head coach Mike Houston and played their home games at Moretz Stadium.

Schedule

References

Lenoir-Rhyne
Lenoir–Rhyne Bears football seasons
South Atlantic Conference football champion seasons
Lenoir-Rhyne Bears football